Owsaluy-e Kazem (also Romanized as Owşālūy-e Kāz̧em; also known as Owşālū-ye Kāz̧em and Ūşālū-ye Kāz̧em) is a village in Tala Tappeh Rural District, Nazlu District, Urmia County, West Azerbaijan Province, Iran. At the 2006 census, its population was 227, in 80 families.

References 

Populated places in Urmia County